Eduardo Iturralde González (born 20 February 1967 in Arrankudiaga) is a retired Spanish football referee. 

He frequently served as a referee for European matches in the Europa League and Champions League. Iturralde notably refereed the El Clásico on three occasions, in 1999, 2005 and most recently in November 2010, in which he was praised for his solid and free-flowing performance.

Iturralde González was the referee of the Republic of Ireland's 2–1 win over Armenia in the last Euro 2012 qualifying match. Early in the game, he sent off Armenian goalkeeper Roman Berezovsky for a handball, although video replays indicated that the ball hit his chest. Two days after the match, the Football Federation of Armenia officially filed a protest to UEFA over the goalkeeper's dismissal.

On 23 March 2012 he announced his retirement from refereeing  due to disagreements with the Spanish Technical Committee, although it was already time for him to retire at the end of the 2011–12 season. His last game was Real Betis vs Real Madrid (2–3) on 10 March 2012. He could not finish this game due to a muscle injury, being substituted by the fourth referee, Gorka Sagués Oscoz, during half time.

References

External links
Eduardo Iturralde Gonzalez stats at worldreferee.com

1967 births
Living people
Sportspeople from Biscay
Spanish football referees
Spanish dentists
People from Arratia-Nerbioi